"It's a Boy" is the third and final single released from Slick Rick's second album, The Ruler's Back. It was released on November 21, 1991 and like the previous two singles, was written by Slick Rick and produced by Vance Wright, while the remix was produced by the Large Professor.

Single track listing

A-Side
"It's a Boy" (LP Version)- 3:29 
"It's a Boy" (Instrumental)- 3:34 
"It's A Boy" (LP Radio Edit)- 3:27

B-Side
"It's a Boy" (Remix)- 3:23 
"It's a Boy" (Remix Instrumental)- 4:00 
"It's a Boy ("King Remix")- 3:20

1991 singles
Slick Rick songs
1991 songs
Def Jam Recordings singles
Songs written by Slick Rick